Baliochila is a genus of butterflies, commonly called buffs, in the family Lycaenidae. They are found only in the Afrotropical realm.

Species
Baliochila abri Henning & Henning, 2004
Baliochila amanica Stempffer & Bennet, 1953
Baliochila aslauga (Trimen, 1873)
Baliochila barnesi Stempffer & Bennett, 1953
Baliochila citrina Henning & Henning, 2004
Baliochila collinsi Henning & Henning, 2004
Baliochila confusa Henning & Henning, 2004
Baliochila congdoni Kielland, 1990
Baliochila dubiosa Stempffer & Bennett, 1953
Baliochila fragilis Stempffer & Bennett, 1953
Baliochila fusca Henning & Henning, 2004
Baliochila hildegarda (Kirby, 1887)
Baliochila latimarginata (Hawker-Smith, 1933)
Baliochila lequeuxi Kielland, 1994
Baliochila megadentata Henning & Henning, 2004
Baliochila minima (Hawker-Smith, 1933)
Baliochila mwanihanae Congdon, Kielland & Collins, 1998
Baliochila neavei Stempffer & Bennett, 1953
Baliochila nguru Kielland, 1986
Baliochila nyasae Stempffer & Bennett, 1953
Baliochila lipara Stempffer & Bennett, 1953
Baliochila pringlei Stempffer, 1967
Baliochila pseudofragilis  Kielland, 1976
Baliochila singularis Stempffer & Bennett, 1953
Baliochila stygia Stempffer & Bennett, 1953
Baliochila warrengashi Collins & Larsen, 1996
Baliochila woodi (Riley, 1943)

External links
Baliochila at Markku Savela's Lepidoptera and some other life forms

Poritiinae
Lycaenidae genera